Peringottukurissi may refer to

 Peringottukurissi-I, a village in Palakkad district, Kerala, India
 Peringottukurissi-II, a village in Palakkad district, Kerala, India
 Peringottukurissi (gram panchayat), a gram panchayat which serves the above villages